Zhou Lüxin (born July 31, 1988 in Wuhu, Anhui) is a Chinese diver. He competed for Team China at the 2008 Summer Olympics in Beijing.

Major achievements
He claimed the gold medal at the 2006 World Cup - 10m platform event. He also won the silver medal at the 2008 Summer Olympics - 10m platform event. Zhou was greatly favored to win the 10m event; however, on his 6th and final dive, a reverse 3½ somersaults, he kicked early and arched in on his entry. He received poor scores while Matthew Mitcham hit his final dive for a record breaking score, overtaking Zhou for the gold medal, while Zhou received the silver medal.

References
 http://2008teamchina.olympic.cn/index.php/personview/personsen/754

1988 births
Living people
Divers at the 2008 Summer Olympics
Olympic divers of China
Olympic silver medalists for China
People from Wuhu
Olympic medalists in diving
Asian Games medalists in diving
Sportspeople from Anhui
Divers at the 2010 Asian Games
Divers at the 2006 Asian Games
Medalists at the 2008 Summer Olympics
Asian Games gold medalists for China
Asian Games silver medalists for China
Medalists at the 2006 Asian Games
Medalists at the 2010 Asian Games
Chinese male divers
20th-century Chinese people
21st-century Chinese people